Raoul Bova (born 14 August 1971) is an Italian actor. Bova's European film breakthrough was in the 1993 film Piccolo grande amore, and he's played romantic male leads the following years. His American film credits include Under the Tuscan Sun (2003), Alien vs. Predator (2004) and The Tourist (2010).

Life and career
Bova was born in Rome to a father from Roccella Ionica in Calabria and mother from Acerra in Campania. At the age of 16 Bova became a local champion in the 100 meter backstroke. At the age of 21 he joined the Italian Army and performed his military duty in the Bersaglieri (sharpshooters) corps. He enrolled in the ISEF, the Italian Institute of Physical Education, but dropped out to pursue a career in acting. He studied at the school of Beatrice Bracco in Rome and also studied acting with Michael Margotta.

After making Italian television debut, Bova starred as a hunky watersports instructor in the 1993 romantic comedy film Pretty Princess. The following years, Bova played many leading roles in the Italian romantic films. In 2002, he made his American film debut appearing in the crime comedy Avenging Angelo. The following year, Bova played Diane Lane's love interest in the comedy-drama film Under the Tuscan Sun. In 2004, he co-starred opposite Sanaa Lathan in the science fiction film Alien vs. Predator. His other notable American film credits include The Tourist (2010), and All Roads Lead to Rome opposite Sarah Jessica Parker.

On television, Bova had a recurring role in the ABC comedy-drama What About Brian from 2006 to 2007, and in 2018 starred as Pope Sixtus IV in the British-Italian period drama Medici. In 2019, he starred opposite Kate del Castillo in the Telemundo/Netflix crime drama series La Reina del Sur.

Personal life
In March 2000, he married Chiara Giordano. In 2013, Bova and Giordano separated. That same year he started dating actress Rocío Muñoz Morales, after the two met on the film set of Immaturi – Il viaggio (2012). They had their first child in December 2015, the same month their film All Roads Lead to Rome was released.

On 15 October 2010, Raoul Bova was nominated Goodwill Ambassador of the Food and Agriculture Organization of the United Nations (FAO).

Raoul Bova is Roman Catholic.

Filmography

Film

Television

References

External links
 
 Raoul Bova as a Style Icon
 FAO Goodwill Ambassador website

1971 births
People of Campanian descent
Italian male television actors
Italian male film actors
Italian male models
Living people
Male actors from Rome
People of Calabrian descent
20th-century Italian male actors
21st-century Italian male actors
FAO Goodwill ambassadors
Italian Roman Catholics